Short Works is a strand of short works of fiction broadcast since 2017 on BBC Radio 4. The 15-minute programmes feature newly commissioned works, often by new writers.

References

External links

2017 radio programme debuts
BBC Radio 4 programmes